Chlorothraupis is a genus of bird in the family Cardinalidae. It was long considered to be a member of the tanager family (Thraupidae), as their common names suggest, but this is false. They are close relatives of the genus Habia, the "ant-tanagers".

Species
It contains the following species:

References

 
Bird genera
Taxa named by Osbert Salvin
Taxa named by Frederick DuCane Godman
Taxonomy articles created by Polbot